Elections to Burnley Borough Council in Lancashire, England were held on 5 May 2011.  One third of the council was up for election and no party won overall control of the council. Arif Khan, the incumbent in the Queensgate ward, defected form the Lib Dems to Labour in October 2010, citing disillusionment with the party’s performance since the general election. The councils only independent, John Jones (former Lib Dem), the incumbent in the Brunshaw ward, did not stand for re-election.

After the election, the composition of the council was
Liberal Democrat 21
Labour 16
Conservative 5
British National Party 1

Election result

Ward results

References
Notes

Sources
2011 BBC News Burnley election result
Burnley Council 2011 Election Results

2011 English local elections
2011
2010s in Lancashire